Chris Stigall is an American conservative talk radio personality, cable news contributor,  online columnist and host of The Chris Stigall podcast.  He was the host of WPHT Morning Show in the Philadelphia market from 2011 to March 2019.  Previously, he hosted The KCMO (AM) Morning Show in the Kansas City market from 2006 till 2010.

Stigall also fills in for nationally syndicated hosts Michael Savage, Rusty Humphries, Lou Dobbs, Fred Thompson, Jerry Doyle and Steve Malzberg.  He has also been a contributor to Andrew Breitbart's website BigHollywood, Philly Magazine, American Spectator and the Platte County Landmark.

A graduate of Northwest Missouri State University, in college, Stigall studied comedy writing and television production as an intern with “Late Show with David Letterman” in New York. Professionally, Stigall has also served as a representative and press assistant to U.S. Congressman Sam Graves (MO-06) as well as working in Kansas City radio since 1999.

In 2009, Stigall was selected as the master of ceremonies at the Mayor’s Christmas Tree lighting ceremony.

On November 18, 2010, WPHT in Philadelphia announced that Stigall will be anchoring its morning show focused on "local and national policy, the economy, the biggest news stories and issues that affect all Philadelphians, coupled with interviews of the day’s news and decision makers."

On March 6, 2019, Stigall and WPHT ended their broadcast partnership after 8-plus years, according to insiders the "split wasn't unpleasant." Stigall went on to launch a podcast version of his previous radio show featuring his former co-host Paige Powers.

Sharyl Attkisson Revelation
On May 25, 2013 Stigall conducted an interview with Sharyl Attkisson and inquired about if she suspected her computer of being hacked as a part of the 2013 Department of Justice investigations of reporters. Sharyl responded that her personal and work computers had been compromised and were under investigation. She responded, "I think there could be some relationship between these types of things and what happened to me," adding that "something suspicious had been happening since." Stigall then had a media clash with Erik Wemple from The Washington Post. Prior to the release of Attkisson's book, Wemple had criticized her for "ladling out hints and half-assertions about the violations of her computers, as she was apparently holding back details that could assist the public in determining just who was responsible for them." Her 2014 book, Stonewalled, chronicled her on-air exchange with Stigall and revealed that it was an unexpected encounter for her that became a national news story.

Charitable Work
In 2012, Stigall made an appearance at a fundraiser to raise money for the Ronald McDonald House of Philadelphia and Delaware.

Through a partnership with the Pennsylvania SPCA and the Piazza Auto Group, Stigall has helped find homes for over 100 shelter animals through his weekly on-air segment “The Piazza Pet of the Week.”

Philadelphia’s USO chapter known as Liberty USO has partnered with Stigall and the Philadelphia Phillies to surprise military service members annually with a trip to Phillies Fantasy Camp in Clearwater, Florida.

Controversy
In March 2011, Stigall became heavily involved in the Delaware County priest trial. Stigall thought The Philadelphia Inquirer was heavily biased in its coverage and one priest and his lawyer declared their innocence on Stigall's morning talk show.

References

External links
 

Living people
1977 births
Radio personalities from Pennsylvania